Kiltimagh GAA or in Irish (CLG Coillte Mach) is a Gaelic football club located in Kiltimagh, County Mayo, Ireland..

History
Balla defeated Kiltimagh in the 2020 Mayo Intermediate Football Championship Final in a shock result.

Achievements
 Only team to lose three consecutive intermediate finals in a row.

Notable players
Peter Burke

References

External sources
Club Website

Gaelic football clubs in County Mayo
Gaelic games clubs in County Mayo